John Bunyan Green Farm is a historic home and farm and national historic district located near Midland, Cabarrus County, North Carolina. The district encompasses 12 contributing buildings, 2 contributing sites, and 1 contributing structure. The farmhouse was built about 1880, and is a two-story, frame dwelling with Italianate style design elements. It features a two-story gabled front porch, a gable roof, and two exterior end chimneys. Also on the property are the contributing ten outbuildings, well canopy, the Garmon Mill site, the miller's house, and the fields and woods.

It was listed on the National Register of Historic Places in 1988.

References

Farms on the National Register of Historic Places in North Carolina
Historic districts on the National Register of Historic Places in North Carolina
Italianate architecture in North Carolina
Houses completed in 1880
Houses in Cabarrus County, North Carolina
National Register of Historic Places in Cabarrus County, North Carolina